Clem Smith Haskins (born August 11, 1943) is an American former college and professional basketball player and college basketball coach. In the fall of 1963, he and fellow star player Dwight Smith became the first black athletes to integrate the Western Kentucky University (WKU) basketball program. This put Western Kentucky at the forefront to integrate college basketball in the South.

Haskins served 13 years (1986–1999) as head coach of the University of Minnesota's men's basketball team, but was forced to resign due to his part in the University of Minnesota basketball scandal. Due to his actions in the scandal, he was given a seven-year show-cause penalty which effectively ended his coaching career, as he has not coached since.

Early life
Haskins was born and grew up in Campbellsville, Kentucky, the county seat. He is the fifth of eleven children of Charles Columbus and Lucy Edna Haskins, who were sharecroppers. During his freshman and sophomore seasons, he attended the all-black Durham High School (public schools were frequently in those years still segregated in the South, years after the practice was declared illegal). In 1961 Haskins attended Taylor County High School, the first African American to do so in the previously segregated system.  His younger brother, Merion, was a standout player at the University of Kentucky, graduating in 1977.

College career
Haskins and teammate Dwight Smith were heavily recruited by Western Kentucky Hilltoppers coach Edgar Diddle and joined the team in 1963. They became the first African-American athletes to play for Western Kentucky. They won the Ohio Valley Conference two years in a row under the direction of the popular WKU head coach John Oldham, who succeeded Diddle their sophomore year. Haskins was the Ohio Valley Conference Player of the Year in 1966. In the 1966 NCAA Division I men's basketball tournament, the Hilltoppers were 2 points away from defeating Michigan and meeting the University of Kentucky Wildcats in the Mideast regional final. A controversial foul called against Smith during a jump ball put Cazzie Russell on the free throw line for Michigan, where he scored the tying and winning baskets. In 1967, Haskins had broken his wrist in a game against Murray State on February 6. His team still won the Ohio Valley Conference again. In the 1967 NCAA Division I men's basketball tournament, the #3-ranked Hilltoppers lost to eventual national runner-up Dayton in overtime in the Mideast quarterfinals.

NBA career
After a successful college career, Haskins was selected by the Chicago Bulls in the first round of the 1967 NBA draft and by the Kentucky Colonels in the American Basketball Association draft. Haskins played nine years in the NBA with three teams (the Bulls, the Phoenix Suns, and the Washington Bullets). He retired in 1976 due to knee injuries, having tallied 8,743 career points.

Coaching career
After his NBA career, Haskins returned to Western Kentucky University, first as an assistant coach in 1977 and then as head coach in 1980. As head coach, he led Western Kentucky to two NCAA appearances and one NIT appearance.

In 1986, Haskins was hired by the University of Minnesota to rebuild the school's men's basketball program. He led the Gophers to a school-record 31 wins and the Final Four in 1997, winning the Clair Bee Coach of the Year Award in the same year. He also led Minnesota to NIT titles in 1993 and 1998. He joined Lenny Wilkens' staff to coach the United States men's basketball team to the gold medal in the 1996 Summer Olympics.

Haskins was known for sitting on a four-legged bar stool at Minnesota home games. Williams Arena has a raised floor which was hard on his knees, and ordinarily the team sits off the floor.

Minnesota academic scandal

On the day before the 1999 NCAA tournament, the St. Paul Pioneer Press reported that Jan Gangelhoff, the manager of the school's academic counseling office, claimed to have written more than 400 pieces of coursework (including theme papers, homework assignments and take-home tests) for 18 Golden Gophers players from 1994 to 1998, including the Gophers' run to the Final Four. The Gophers suspended four then-current players, including two starters, for the school's first-round game against Gonzaga; the Gophers lost that game. At the time, it was not known whether Haskins was involved. The Pioneer Press was harshly criticized for the timing of the report. The university forced Haskins to resign after the season for his part in violations. Minnesota withdrew its team from postseason consideration for the 1999–2000 season, docked itself 11 scholarships from 2000 to 2004, and imposed other sanctions on the basketball program.

Initially, the university bought out Haskins's contract for $1.5 million. However, it sought to recover funds after learning more about Haskins' activities and, in 2002, a state judge ordered Haskins to return $815,000 of the buyout money. The decision was based on an arbitrator's recommendation and the university's conclusion that Haskins had lied to NCAA investigators and committed fraud by accepting the buyout.

The university had learned during its internal investigation that Haskins had paid Gangelhoff $3,000 to write papers for the players. Haskins had initially denied making the payment during an interview in June 1999, but acknowledged it a month later. In October 2000, the NCAA placed the Golden Gophers program on four years' probation, and stripped the school of its wins in the 1994, 1995, and 1997 NCAA Tournaments, as well as its NIT wins in 1996 and 1998. The Gophers were docked an additional five scholarships over three seasons. A few days later, the Big Ten Conference stripped Minnesota of the 1997 conference title and forced it to vacate every regular season game it played from 1993–94 to 1998–99. Officially, Minnesota's record for those years is 0–0. If not for these vacated games, Haskins' 242 wins would rank second on the Golden Gophers' wins list.

The NCAA imposed a seven-year "show-cause" order on Haskins. This meant that he would have to accept sanctions from the NCAA if he ever returned to coaching before the 2007-08 season unless his new employer could convince the NCAA that he'd served his punishment. The penalty was made so severe because Haskins had not only lied about the $3,500 payment, but advised several of the players involved to lie to the NCAA. Since most schools will not even consider hiring a coach with an outstanding "show-cause" on his record, Haskins was effectively blackballed from collegiate basketball until 2007.

After coaching
Haskins did not return to coaching when his show-cause expired. He retired to his  ranch near Campbellsville, Kentucky, where he raises cattle. He has also worked as a color commentator for Western Kentucky basketball home games.

Awards
High School Scholastic All-American, 1963
Ohio Valley Conference Player of the Year, 1966, 1967
First team All-American, 1967
Ohio Valley Conference Coach of the Year, 1982
Associated Press Coach of the Year, 1997

Head coaching record

See also

 List of National Basketball Association players with most assists in a game
 List of NCAA Division I Men's Final Four appearances by coach

Notes
 . Tournament appearances from 1994 to 1998 were vacated by the NCAA. Minnesota also gained 1 win each in the 1994–95 and 1995–96 seasons via forfeits by opponents. Following a Big Ten Conference order to vacate all regular season games from 1993–94 to 1998–99, Minnesota erased all individual and team records from those seasons.

References

External links
 NBA Stats @ basketball-reference.com

1943 births
Living people
20th-century African-American sportspeople
21st-century African-American people
African-American basketball coaches
African-American basketball players
All-American college men's basketball players
American men's basketball coaches
American men's basketball players
Basketball coaches from Kentucky
Basketball players from Kentucky
Chicago Bulls draft picks
Chicago Bulls players
College men's basketball head coaches in the United States
Kentucky Colonels draft picks
Minnesota Golden Gophers men's basketball coaches
NCAA sanctions
People from Campbellsville, Kentucky
Phoenix Suns players
Shooting guards
Washington Bullets players
Western Kentucky Hilltoppers basketball coaches
Western Kentucky Hilltoppers basketball players